Tough Guys Don't Dance is the debut album from British production duo Soulsavers. The album was released in the UK on 13 October 2003. Spain lead singer Josh Haden sings vocals on the songs "Love," "Down So Low" and "Precious Time." Haden's own song "Spiritual" would later be covered by Mark Lanegan and Soulsavers on the duo's next album It's Not How Far You Fall, It's the Way You Land.

The song "Closer" was also released on the band's Closer EP on 22 November 2004.

Track listing

Credits
 All songs produced by The Soulsavers (Rich Machin and Ian Glover).

References

2003 debut albums
Soulsavers albums